The Susan Powter Show is an American talk show broadcast in syndication from 1994 to 1995 and hosted by diet guru Susan Powter.

Format
Host Susan Powter would discuss current issues and news items ranging from social and political issues to tabloid headlines and discuss other issues and topics related to women.

References

External links

Susan Powter Official Website

1994 American television series debuts
1995 American television series endings
1990s American television talk shows
First-run syndicated television programs in the United States
English-language television shows
Television series by Universal Television